Kashima (鹿島) may refer to:

Places in Japan
Kashima District, Ibaraki, a district in Ibaraki Prefecture
Kashima, Ibaraki, a city in Ibaraki Prefecture
Kashima Soccer Stadium
Kashima Soccer Stadium Station, railway station
Kashima Power Station
Kashimajingū Station, railway station
Kashima-Ōno Station, railway station
Kashima Shrine, a Shinto shrine
Kashima, Saga, a city in Saga Prefecture
Hizen-Kashima Station, railway station
Kashima Gatalympics, an annual sporting event
Kashima, Kumamoto, a town in Kumamoto Prefecture
Kashima, Shimane, a town in Shimane Prefecture
Kashima, Fukushima, a former town in Fukushima Prefecture (now part of Minamisōma, Fukushima)
Kashima Station (Fukushima), railway station
Kashima District, Ishikawa, a district in Ishikawa Prefecture
Kashima, Ishikawa, a former town in Ishikawa Prefecture (now part of Nakanoto, Ishikawa)
Kashima, Kagoshima, a former village in Kagoshima Prefecture (now part of Satsumasendai, Kagoshima)
Kashima Station (Osaka), a railway station in Yodogawa-ku, Osaka
Kashima Domain, a historical tozama feudal domain of the Edo period
Port of Kashima, seaport located in the cities of Kamisu and Kashima

Martial arts and sport
Kashima Antlers (from Kashima, Ibaraki), is a professional football team playing in the J. League
Kashima Shin-ryū is a koryū martial art
Kashima Shintō-ryū is a koryū martial art focusing on kenjutsu
Kashima Shinden Jikishinkage-ryū is a koryū teaching kenjutsu

Military
Japanese battleship Kashima, a pre-dreadnought battleship operating from 1906 to 1924
Japanese cruiser Kashima, a light cruiser operated from 1940 until 1947
JDS Kashima (TV-3508), a Japan Maritime Self-Defense Force training vessel operated from 1995 to present

Other uses
Kashima (god), a Shinto god who restrains the Namazu
Kashima (surname)
Kashima Railway Line, a closed railway line
Kashima Reiko, a Japanese urban legend, similar to Teke Teke

See also
Kajima, the construction corporation, pronounced with a J instead of a SH sound